XHPPLY-FM is a radio station on 96.1 FM in Playa del Carmen, Quintana Roo. It is owned by Carlos de Jesús Aguirre Gómez and carries the Los 40 pop format from Radiópolis.

History
XHPPLY was awarded in the IFT-4 radio auction of 2017 on a rebound after the initial winning bidder, Tecnoradio, failed to pay for dozens of stations they had bought across the country, including their 55.7 million peso bid for this frequency. The winning bid by a consortium of Carlos de Jesús Aguirre Gómez and CJAguirre Nacional, S.A.P.I. de C.V., was 11.5 million pesos.

References

External links

Radio stations in Quintana Roo
Radio stations established in 2018
2018 establishments in Mexico